The Sweden–Kampuchea Friendship Association was a Swedish Maoist pro–Khmer Rouge Kampuchea friendship organization.

The five people of the organization (including Jan Myrdal) made a trip to Democratic Kampuchea in 1978 in which they met with Pol Pot.

History 
The Sweden–Kampuchea Friendship Association was founded in 1976 as part of associations against the Vietnam War. It was influenced by the Maoist Communist Workers' Party of Sweden and other pro–Khmer Rouge organizations in Denmark and Norway.

Visited to Kampuchea 
In August 1978, 5 members of the organization visited Democratic Kampuchea for 14 days. In this they met with Pol Pot and Ieng Sary.

References 

Anti–Vietnam War groups